The Bauhinia Party is a pro-Beijing conservative political party in Hong Kong. Established in 2020 by a group of mainland Chinese executives working at the financial institutions in Hong Kong, the party was perceived as catering to the haigui in Hong Kong, mainland Chinese students who relocated to Hong Kong after studying abroad.

Background
Named after the city’s official flower bauhinia × blakeana, the Bauhinia Party was established in March 2020  and filed to the Hong Kong Companies Registry in May by Li Shan, Wong Chau-chi and Chen Jianwen, all of whom were the mainland Chinese executives who worked at the top financial institutions in Hong Kong. Born in Sichuan, educated in the United States and had worked in Hong Kong for some 20 years, Li was a Hong Kong delegate to the national committee of the Chinese People’s Political Consultative Conference (CPPCC) and a director of Credit Suisse's board. Wong was also born on the mainland and was educated at the Harvard University before he worked at Goldman Sachs, Citibank and BNP Paribas and was then the chairman and chief executive of CMMB Vision and a director of private equity fund Chi Capital. Both Li and Wong are heard to hold higher-up positions in Hong Kong's Chinese Communist Party School Commercial Professionals Alumni Association (CAGA).

The party was not known to the public until an exclusive interview by the South China Morning Post in December 2020. The predominance of the mainland "Haigui" drew a lot of speculation from the media. Due to the "obvious links" to the Chinese Communist Party, the party was perceived to be closely tied to the Beijing authorities and worked as the underground Communist Party operatives, and to sideline or replace the existing local pro-Beijing parties who had failed to support the SAR administration. The local pro-Beijing parties dismissed any speculation of the Bauhinia becoming the threat to them. James Tien of the pro-business Liberal Party believed that Beijing did not want to tilt the balance of power by replacing the incumbents with a group of lesser-known, mainland-born people. Regina Ip of the New People's Party said the new party must prove itself with electoral success as it was not easy to win seats.

Platform
According to the document in the Companies Registry, the party seeks to "promote a democratic political system best suited to Hong Kong based on the rule of law and civil liberty with the realisation of universal suffrage as guaranteed by the Basic Law, so as to safeguard Hong Kong's long-term prosperity and stability." Some of the platforms include:

 Seeking for "another fifty years – unchanged – and have a hundred years of One Country, Two Systems"; 
 Loving China and Hong Kong, safeguarding the rule of law and opposing discrimination against communities; 
 Turning the Legislative Council into a bicameral legislature of which the members of the lower house would be directly elected, while members of the upper house would be appointed by the Chief Executive through a political consultative committee; and
  Establishing a public-private partnership to finance the Lantau Tomorrow Vision plan, a 1,700-hectare project to build a metropolis on man-made islands off Lantau.
Democratic Development: The Party will actively promote the eventual realization of a broad-based universal suffrage for Hong Kong’s Chief Executive and Legislative Members as stipulated under the Basic Law and under the principle of gradual and systematic progression, so that Hong Kong will achieve a highly participated democratic system that is equitable and fair, prosperous and stable, virtuous and inclusive, efficient and righteous.
Housing Reform: The Party will advocate short, medium, and long-term housing policies addressing Hong Kong’s problems. It will prioritize people-first principle while balancing considerations for economics, environment, and social equity, engaging in initiatives that will embrace ocean land reclamation, country park re-zoning, farmland conversion, and joint-development with nearby Greater Bay Area cities, such that Hong Kong will be able to expand its living space in scale and scope and attain for its people to eventually have their own homes.
Economic Innovation: The Party will advocate development policies to render HK as a more diversified economy, which will seek to strengthen Hong Kong’s pillar industries such as finance, tourism, trading, and logistics while inducing new industries such as Artificial Intelligence, 5G, Quantum Computing, Biotechnology, IoT and other innovative services. In particular, we hope Hong Kong to enjoin with the Great Bay Area development by providing its vast international expertise to lead Greater Bay Area’s transformation into the world’s top international metropolis, thereby also creating numerous opportunities for Hong Kong and enhancing its overall competitiveness and income level.
Education Improvement: The Party will push for modernizing Hong Kong’s education system, introducing programs that will imbue our young generation with a strong sense of national and cultural identity, and enrich their life-long planning with opportunities availed by the One Country Two Systems, so that they will be more confident and competitive in planting their feet in Hong Kong while leaning on China and embracing the global opportunities as Hong Kong’s torch-bearer.
East-West Exchange: With the unchanging One Country Two Systems and core value of freedom, democracy, and rule of law as the basis, Hong Kong as an international city should enlarge its role as the key bridge for trade, economic, culture exchange between the East and West. The Party will promote initiatives to strengthen Hong Kong as a global hub so as to  facilitate China’s integration with the world and help the world better understand China. It will also embolden Hong Kong's role in facilitating the RMB internationalization, China-EU Comprehensive Agreement on Investment, and Regional Comprehensive Economic Partnership Agreement, etc., so that Hong Kong will be able to capture first-mover opportunities while restoring its luster.

The party aims at recruiting more than 250,000 members from all across the sectors. It will also set up a think tank and public opinion survey institution and plans to offer candidates for Legislative Council and Chief Executive elections.

See also
 Chinese Communist Party
 Hong Kong Liaison Office
 New Hong Kong Alliance
 New immigrants in Hong Kong
 United Front (China)

References

Political parties established in 2020
Political parties in Hong Kong
2020 establishments in Hong Kong
Conservative parties in Hong Kong